Terror alert systems are standardised emergency population warning systems for describing and disseminating information about terrorism-related threats. They became more popular after the September 11 attacks on the United States in 2001.

Australia
National Counter-Terrorism Alert Level

 Certain - terrorist attack is imminent or has occurred
 Expected- terrorist attack is highly likely
 Probable - terrorist attack is likely
 Possible - terrorist attack could occur
 Low - terrorist attack is not expected

Administered by the Federal Attorney-General's Department.

France

Plan Vigipirate

 Yellow - to stress vigilance
 Orange - to warn of terrorist action
 Red - to warn of serious attempts
 Crimson - to warn of major attempts

Ireland (Republic of)
International Terror Threat Level

 Low: An attack is deemed unlikely.
 Moderate: An attack is possible, but not likely.
 Substantial: An attack is a strong possibility.
 Severe: An attack is highly likely.
 Critical: An attack is imminent or has occurred.

Administered by the Garda Síochána.

Since November 2015, the international terrorism threat level is considered to be at moderate, meaning an attack is "possible but not likely".

Netherlands

Russia 
 Blue - an unconfirmed information about real terroristic threat
 Yellow - a confirmed information about real terroristic threat
 Red - an information about committed terrorist act

United Kingdom

 Low - an attack is unlikely
 Moderate - an attack is possible, but not likely
 Substantial - an attack is a strong possibility
 Severe - an attack is highly likely
 Critical - an attack is expected imminently or has occurred 

Administered by the Joint Terrorist Analysis Centre

United States

Homeland Security Advisory System

 Low - Low risk of terrorist attacks
 Guarded - General risk of terrorist attacks
 Elevated - Significant risk of terrorist attacks
 High - High risk of terrorist attacks
 Severe - Severe risk of terrorist attacks

Administered by the Department of Homeland Security

National Terrorism Advisory System

 Elevated Threat - Significant or high risk of terrorist attacks
 Imminent Threat - Critical risk of terrorist attacks

References

Alert measurement systems